Donald Brian (25 October 1925 – 17 November 2015) was a New Zealand cricketer. He played first-class cricket for Central Districts and Wellington between 1946 and 1956.

References

External links
 

1925 births
2015 deaths
New Zealand cricketers
Central Districts cricketers
Wellington cricketers
Cricketers from Lower Hutt